Stockton Town Football Club is an English football club based in Stockton-on-Tees, England. They are managed by former player Michael Dunwell, who retired from playing in 2014.

The club are notable for reaching the Final of the FA Vase in the 2017–18 season, where they finished as runners-up, after being defeated 1–0 by champions Thatcham Town. Their previous success includes four consecutive Wearside Football League titles between 2012 and 2016, two consecutive Wearside League Cup titles between 2014 and 2016, two consecutive Monkwearmouth Charity Cup titles between 2014 and 2016, as well as winning the Shipowners Charity Cup in the 2014–15 season.

Their club badge, which includes their motto, "Fortitudo et Spes" (Latin for "Strength and Hope"), is navy and yellow, representing their traditional colours. The historic club nickname, "the Anchors", is taken from the Stockton coat of arms, representing the town's shipbuilding history during the seventeenth and eighteenth centuries.

History
The club was initially formed in 1979 as Hartburn Juniors, entering a 5-a-side league in Middlesbrough to give youngsters an opportunity to play organised football. The club changed to their name to Stockton Town in 2003.

For the 2009–10 season, a senior team was entered into the Teesside League Division Two and finished in fourth place in their first season. In the summer of 2010, the club applied for membership to the Wearside League and were accepted for the 2010–11 season where they finished in tenth place. In the 2011–12 season, the club finished third in the league and lost in the final of the League Cup.

The club won their first league title in the 2012–13 season, and repeated the feat in their following league campaign, finishing the season with a league record of 104 points. At the end of the 2014–15 season, the club applied for qualification to the Northern League Division Two. However, despite winning the league title for a third time, their application was withdrawn due to legal issues.

In the 2015–16 season, the club won their fourth consecutive league title to gain promotion to Northern League. The following season, the club played their first ever FA Vase tie, beating Eccleshill United 2–0, before gaining their most famous victory to date, beating four-time winners, Whitley Bay, 2–0 in the next round. On 15 April, the club won 2–1 at Team Northumbria, to clinch the Division Two title and gain promotion to the Northern Football League Division One.

In only their second ever Northern League campaign, Stockton reached the final of the 2017–18 FA Vase. They played Thatcham Town of the Hellenic League. The final, played at Wembley Stadium, took place on 20 May, with Stockton narrowly losing by 1–0. Furthermore, that season's semi-final against Marske United, taking place on home turf and resulting in a 2–0 victory in Stockton's favour, saw the ground record broken, with an attendance of 3,300 (1,800 of Stockton).

In the 2019–20 season, Stockton were leading the table by 13 points with eight games left to play. However, as a result of the COVID-19 pandemic, the Football Association ruled that the entire league would be expunged, with no sides in the league being promoted or relegated, thus denying Stockton promotion despite being top of the league. Representatives from the team and local Member of Parliament, Alex Cunningham, protested against the movement though the ruling stayed in force. After the 2020–21 season was curtailed for the second consecutive season, results from both seasons were combined, which resulted in Stockton Town being promoted to the eighth tier of English football, joining the newly formed Northern Premier League Division One East for the 2021–22 season. In their first season, Stockton reached the play-off Final, but lost 2–1 to Marske United.

Ground
In April 2008, the club moved to facilities at Bishopton Road West in Stockton-on-Tees. These facilities were built in partnership with the Football Foundation, Stockton Sixth Form College and Our Lady and St Bede Catholic Academy. In total, the project cost approximately £1.4 million, with close to £200,000 spent on the drainage of the pitches and the remainder on the new building containing 6 new changing rooms, 2 changing rooms for officials, an educational room, a club room and a drama and dance studio.

In July 2015, the club narrowly won approval from planners for expansion, at a cost of around £800,000. The plans, which had been recommended for approval by Stockton's planning officers, included fencing, flood lights, stands, dug outs, a turnstile, a changing block, a storage container and refreshments room. They had previously been given the green light a year previously to erect a 200-seat stand, floodlighting, artificial (3G) turf pitch, pay booth, changing facilities and toilet and refreshment areas. However, the expansion had met with a mixed response from residents, with 69 letters of objection submitted against 50 in support. A 105-signature petition of support was also submitted by the principal of Stockton Sixth Form college, insisting that students would benefit from the scheme.

Management team
As of 24 September 2022

Honours
Stockton Town's honours include:
 Northern Premier League Division One East
Play-off runners-up: 2021–22
 Northern Football League Division 1
Promotion: 2020–21 (combined results of two previously curtailed seasons)
 FA Vase
Runners-up: 2017–18
 Northern Football League Division 2
Champions: 2016–17
 Northern League Ernest Armstrong Trophy
Runners-up: 2016–17
Wearside Football League
Champions: 2012–13, 2013–14, 2014–15, 2015–16
Wearside League Cup
Champions: 2014–15, 2015–16
Monkwearmouth Charity Cup
Champions: 2014–15, 2015–16
Shipowners Charity Cup
Champions: 2014–15

See also
Stockton RFC
Stockton Cricket Club

References

External links
Club website

Football clubs in England
Football clubs in County Durham
Association football clubs established in 1987
1987 establishments in England
Teesside Football League
Wearside Football League
Northern Football League
Northern Premier League clubs